48th Battalion or 48th Infantry Battalion may refer to:

 48th Battalion (Australia), a unit of the Australian Army 
 2/48th Battalion (Australia), a unit of the Australian Army that served during World War II
 48th Battalion (British Columbia), CEF, a unit of the Canadian Expeditionary Force during World War I
 48th Battalion Iowa Volunteer Infantry

See also
 48th Division (disambiguation)
 48th Brigade (disambiguation)